Halina is a given name. Notable people with the name include:

Halina Łukomska (born 1929), Polish soprano
Halina Aszkiełowicz (born 1947), Polish former volleyball player and 1968 Olympic medallist
Halina Balon (born 1948), Polish fencer
Halina Biegun (born 1955), Polish luger who competed during the late 1970s
Halina Birenbaum (born 1929), Holocaust survivor, writer, poet and translator
Halina Buyno-Łoza (1907–1991), Polish theatre actress and dancer
Halina Czerny-Stefańska (1922–2001), Polish pianist
Halina Górecka (born 1938), former Polish and German sprinter and Olympic gold and bronze medal winner
Halina Górska (1898–1942), Polish writer and a communist activist
Halina Harelava (born 1951), Belarusian contemporary composer
Halina Kanasz (born 1953), Polish luger who competed during the 1970s
Halina Karnatsevich (born 1969), Belarusian long-distance runner
Halina Konopacka (born 1900), famous athlete, first Polish Olympic Champion (1928, Amsterdam)
Halina Krahelska (1892–1945), Polish activist, publicist and writer
Halina Krzyżanowska (1860–1937), internationally renowned Polish-French pianist and composer
Halina Kwiatkowska (1921–2020), Polish actress
Halina Jaroszewiczowa (1892–1940), Polish politician
Halina Lacheta, Polish luger who competed in the late 1950s
Halina Machulska (born 1929), Polish theater, film and television actress
Halina Mierzejewska (1922–2003), professor of linguistics at the University of Warsaw, in the Institute of Polish Language
Halina Mlynkova (born 1977), Czech-born Polish singer, leader of a popular Polish folk-rock group Brathanki
Halina Molka (born 1953), Polish politician
Halina Murias (born 1955), Polish politician
Halina Olendzka (born 1945), Polish politician
Halina Poświatowska (1935–1967), Polish poet and writer, an important figure in modern Polish literature
Halina Reijn (born 1975), Dutch actress and writer
Halina Rozpondek (born 1950), Polish politician
Halina Szwarc de domo Kłąb (1923–2002), member of the Polish resistance during the Second World War
Halina Szymańska (1906–1989), wife of Colonel Antoni Szymański, the last prewar Polish military attaché in Berlin
Halina Tam (born 1972), model, singer and television actress

See also
Halina Czerny-Stefańska in memoriam International Piano Competition
Helena (given name)

de:Halina
it:Halina